Steelscape is an American instrumental progressive heavy metal band from Bremerton, Washington, United States, which formed in 2004.

History
Under the name "Solipsys", the band was started by guitarist John Ronkar and drummer Josh Neumann. Along with vocalist Brian Binz, bassist Matt Orosz, and lead guitarist (and Ronkar's cousin) John Bevis, Solipsys released its self recorded and produced album titled Terminal in March 2005. After opening for major touring acts such as 3 Inches of Blood, Solipsys parted ways with vocalist Binz.

Solipsys then changed the name to Steelscape after finding replacement vocalist Ryan Coleman. Steelscape released a four song EP titled Cleanse and Divide in 2007. After a low point in the bands performing and recognition, Coleman moved to Florida once again leaving the band without a singer. After several failed auditions, the remaining four members of Steelscape decided to remain instrumental.

The band began to see an increased popularity as a strictly instrumental band as they continued to grow their underground fan base in local bars and venues. They re-released the Cleanse and Divide EP without any vocals in early 2008. In June 2009, John Bevis left Steelscape after being accepted to a school in Texas. Steelscape then found lead guitarist Kevin Crew to replace Bevis.

Within three months of Crew joining the band, Wildcard Movies (a northwest film production company for extreme sports such as snowboarding, wakeboarding, etc.) asked Steelscape to provide their track "Blueshift" to their first production titled How The Northwest Was One. Steelscape's "Blueshift" was used in the movie as well as on the teaser, which was broadcast on national television on Fuel TV's The Daily Habit on September 4, 2009. Fuel TV continued to air How The Northwest Was One throughout the next several weeks.

Steelscape released its latest EP titled Blueshift in mid-2009. This is an enhanced CD which includes five studio tracks, three live tracks, and bonus footage including the making of the track "Absolute Horizon". The release brought Steelscape a large amount of publicity including a headlining article in the area newspaper.

In May 2010, Steelscape was again approached by Wildcard Movies to provide music for their latest release The Saturday Night Ride. The band was asked to provide three of their original tracks and to score a track specifically for the main theme of the movie. Steelscape was again used on both teasers released by Wildcard Movies. The teasers reached a national status being featured on espn.com, Transworld Snowboarding, and numerous other websites. Steelscape was then asked to play The Saturday Night Ride movie premiere at The King Cat Theater in Seattle, Washington on October 8, 2010.

Steelscape's current lineup is: Guitar - John Ronkar, Guitar - Kevin Crew, Bass - Matt Orosz, Drums - Josh Neumann.

References

American progressive metal musical groups
Heavy metal musical groups from Washington (state)